Murray Field  is a county-owned public airport, located adjacent to Humboldt Bay within Eureka, California in Humboldt County. Most of its use is general aviation, but UPS flights stop for package delivery.

History
Murray Field was established in 1919 by pilot Dayton Murray, Senior, and was later named for him after the county acquired the field in the 1930s.  The airport is built on filled land.  In 1976, the airport had scheduled passenger airline service operated by Eureka Aero Industries, a commuter air carrier that operated Cessna 402 twin prop aircraft.

Facilities and aircraft 

Its one runway, 11/29, is  asphalt. Medium Intensity Runway Lights (MIRL) are the only airport lighting. Runways 11 and 29 have Visual Approach Slope Indicators (VASI) and a parallel taxi-way. The original runway 7-25 was shut down as substandard in 1997.

It has a charter service, Northern Air, as well as a Civil Air Patrol office. There was once a restaurant but it has closed permanently.

In 2007 the airport had 65,450 aircraft operations, average 179 per day: 99% general aviation, <1% air taxi and <1% military. In 2005 101 aircraft were based at the airport: 90 single-engine, 11 multi-engine.

Other local airports 
 Arcata-Eureka Airport
 Eureka Municipal Airport
 Kneeland Airport

References

External links 
 
 
Live Webcams at Murray Field

Eureka, California
Airports in Humboldt County, California
Airports established in 1919
1919 establishments in California